Alone Together is an American sitcom that was created by and starring Benji Aflalo and Esther Povitsky. Eben Russell also co-created the series and executive produces alongside Aflalo and Povitsky. The series is also produced by The Lonely Island's Andy Samberg, Akiva Schaffer and Jorma Taccone. It follows two platonic best friends who attempt to find a foothold in Los Angeles. It premiered on January 10, 2018 on Freeform. The series' second season began airing on August 1, 2018.

On November 2, 2018, Freeform canceled the series after two seasons.

Premise
Two millennial misfits strike up a platonic friendship in order to navigate life in vain and status-obsessed Los Angeles.

Cast

Main
 Esther Povitsky as Esther, a woman from the Midwest who is trying to make it as a comedian
 Benji Aflalo as Benji, a trust fund kid from Beverly Hills who lives with his older brother

Recurring
 Edgar Blackmon as Jeff, Esther's and Benji's mutual friend
 Chris D'Elia as Dean, Benji's older brother
 Ginger Gonzaga as Alia, Benji's older sister
 Punam Patel as Tara, a friend from an acting class Esther previously took (season 2)

Production
While working at The Comedy Store, Aflalo, a comedy writer and stand-up, met another relatively new comedian, Esther Povitsky. In 2015, Povitsky and Aflalo wrote, starred in, and self-produced the short film "Alone Together."

Development on the series was underway in April 2016. A pilot was greenlit in July 2016, and it was picked up to series by Freeform in December 2016. Chris D'Elia, Ginger Gonzaga, Edgar Blackmon, Hayley Marie Norman, Kamilla Alnes, Jim O'Heir and Justine Lupe guest star in the series' pilot.

The series was renewed for a second season by Freeform in October 2017, before the first season had even aired. Season 2 premiered on August 1, 2018. All ten episodes were released for immediate streaming on Hulu. Season 2 guest stars included Carmen Electra, Nikki Glaser, Seth Morris, and Fran Drescher.

Freeform cancelled the program on November 2, 2018 after two seasons. Alone Together did not garner a large viewership, with an average of 268,000 viewers per episode after seven days of DVR.

Episodes

Season 1 (2018)

Season 2 (2018)

Reception
On the review aggregator Rotten Tomatoes, the series has an approval rating of 62% based on 13 reviews, with an average rating of 5.9/10. The site's critical consensus reads, "Esther Povistky and Benji Alflalo's awkward charms and convincingly platonic chemistry work, though Alone Togethers lack of urgency keeps its nihilistic tenderness from truly jelling." On Metacritic, which assigns a normalized rating, the series has a score 60 out of 100, based on 6 critics, indicating "mixed or average reviews".

Season 1 (2018)

Season 2 (2018)

Notes

References

External links

2010s American single-camera sitcoms
2018 American television series debuts
2018 American television series endings
English-language television shows
Freeform (TV channel) original programming
Television shows set in Los Angeles